Freedom is an unincorporated community in Sanpete County, Utah, United States.



Description

It was settled in 1871 during a post-Civil War period when several patriotic names developed. The town was originally named Draper for an early settler, but was renamed Freedom in 1877.

The community has always been closely associated with the town of Moroni, even being included in its census precinct through most of its history.

See also

References

External links

Unincorporated communities in Sanpete County, Utah
Unincorporated communities in Utah
Populated places established in 1871
1871 establishments in Utah Territory